Luke Brennan may refer to:

 Luke Brennan (Australian footballer) (born 1985), Australian rules footballer for Hawthorn and Sydney
 Luke Brennan (English footballer) (born 2001), English footballer for Blackburn Rovers